Khatystyr (Xatııstıır) is a rural locality (a selo), the administrative centre of and one of two settlements, in addition to Ugoyan, in Belletsky Evenk National Rural Okrug of Aldansky District in the Sakha Republic, Russia. Its population as of the 2010 Census was 1,385; up from 1,308 recorded in the 2002 Census.

References

Notes

Sources
Official website of the Sakha Republic. Registry of the Administrative-Territorial Divisions of the Sakha Republic. Aldansky District. 

Rural localities in Aldansky District